Megalobulimus parafragilior is a species of air-breathing land snail, a terrestrial pulmonate gastropod mollusk in the family Strophocheilidae.

It is endemic to Brazil and has been found in São Paulo and Paraná states.

References

parafragilior
Endemic fauna of Brazil
Taxonomy articles created by Polbot
Gastropods described in 1990